Anundsen is a surname. Notable people with the surname include:

 Anders Anundsen (born 1975), Norwegian politician
 Brynild Anundsen (1844–1913), Norwegian-American newspaper editor and publisher
 Sara Anundsen (born 1985), American tennis player

See also
 Amundsen (surname)